Lourdes-de-Blanc-Sablon Airport  is located  north of Blanc-Sablon, Le Golfe-du-Saint-Laurent Regional County Municipality, in administrative region of Côte-Nord, Quebec, Canada.

Airlines and destinations

See also

Related articles
 Côte-Nord (North-Shore), administrative region
 Le Golfe-du-Saint-Laurent Regional County Municipality
 Strait of Belle Isle
 Blanc-Sablon
 Blanc-Sablon Bay

References

External links

Certified airports in Côte-Nord